Paek Ok-sim (born 1 June 1998) is a North Korean sport shooter.

She participated at the 2018 ISSF World Shooting Championships, winning a medal.

References

External links

Living people
1998 births
North Korean female sport shooters
ISSF pistol shooters